The Illaeninae are a suborder of trilobites in the order Corynexochida.

References 

 
Corynexochida